Football Club Bastelicaccia is a French football club based in Bastelicaccia, Corsica, they currently play in the Régional 1 championship, the sixth level of French football.

Founded in 2003, they used to play in the fifth tier of French football, in the Championnat National 3 after finishing top of the 2017-2018 Division d'Honneur (Regional 1) of the Corsican football league.

History
In 2007, the club won the regional Division d'Honneur for the first time and were promoted to what was then called the CFA2, now the National 3. However, the club was relegated the following season after finishing 14th. Current players include Mathieu Scarpelli and they are managed by Jean-Luc Lucciani, with former footballer Jean-Roch Testa as assistant.

Current squad

References

Football clubs in Corsica
Association football clubs established in 2003
2003 establishments in France
Football clubs in France
Sport in Corse-du-Sud